The 2007 IAAF World Road Running Championships were held in Udine, Italy on 14 October 2007.
Detailed reports on the event and an appraisal of the results were given both
for the men's race and for the women's race.

Medallists

Race results
Complete results were published for the men's race, for the women's race, for men's team, and for women's team.

Men's

Women's

†: Susan Chepkemei from  initially did not finish, but was tested positive for Salbutamol and disqualified.

Team results

Men's

Women's

Participation
The participation of 144 athletes (82 men/62 women) from 37 countries is reported.

 (1)
 (4)
 (2)
 (1)
 (3)
 (7)
 (6)
 (1)
 (1)
 (1)
 (6)
 (9)
 (1)
 (4)
 (1)
 (1)
 (10)
 (2)
 (9)
 (10)
 (4)
 (2)
 (5)
 (5)
 (7)
 (5)
 (5)
 (3)
 (4)
 (2)
 (5)
 (4)
 (3)
 (5)
 (2)
 (2)
 (1)

See also
2007 in athletics (track and field)

References

External links
IAAF site

World Road Running Championships
Sport in Udine
World Athletics Half Marathon Championships
International athletics competitions hosted by Italy